Koleyn may refer to:
 Koleyn, Qazvin
 Koleyn, Tehran
 Koleyn Rural District, in Tehran Province